(lit. 'Pure Land Beach') is a series of rock formations along the coast of Miyako Bay in the city of Miyako, Iwate Prefecture, in the Tōhoku region of northern Japan. The area is part of the Sanriku Fukkō National Park, and is a nationally designated Place of Scenic Beauty.

Overview
The area consists of groups of Paleogene period volcanic rock formations in a sandy beach area, which have been weathered by wind and rains into fantastic shapes. Together with Japanese red pine trees, the rocks form a natural version of a Japanese garden. The rock formations have inspired many fanciful names, and by the early Edo period has been identified in popular imagination with various landscape features of the Buddhist Western Paradise. The name of "Jōdogahama" was coined by a Sōtō  Zen priest who toured the area in the Tenna era (1681–1684), and this name appears in the official records of Morioka Domain under the rule of Nanbu Toshitaka in 1797. The area was also popularised by the works of Kenji Miyazawa in 1917.

Formerly part of the Rikuchū Kaigan National Park from its formation in May 1955,the area was incorporated into the Sanriku Fukkō National Park after the 2011 Tōhoku earthquake and tsunami.

Gallery

See also

 National Parks of Japan
List of Places of Scenic Beauty of Japan (Iwate)
 Hotokegaura

References

Beaches of Japan
Landforms of Iwate Prefecture
Places of Scenic Beauty
Miyako, Iwate
Tourist attractions in Iwate Prefecture
IUCN Category III